Tine Kongsholm (born 9 December 1969) is a Danish alpine skier. She competed in two events at the 1992 Winter Olympics.

References

External links
 

1969 births
Living people
Danish female alpine skiers
Olympic alpine skiers of Denmark
Alpine skiers at the 1992 Winter Olympics
People from Roskilde
Sportspeople from Region Zealand